Everard Central (postcode: 5461) is a locality in South Australia's Mid North. The locality is situated in approximately the southern two thirds of the cadastral Hundred of Everard.

Hundred of Everard

The Hundred of Everard is the cadastral unit of hundred on the northern Adelaide Plains containing the Everard Central locality. It is one of the 16 hundreds of the County of Stanley. It was named in 1867 by Governor Dominick Daly after William Everard (1819–1889), a South Australian parliamentarian. The southern third of the locality of Condowie is also situated inside the bounds of the Hundred of Everard.

Local government
In 1888 the Hundred of Everard was annexed to the District Council of Blyth as part of the District Councils Act 1887. Not long after, on 26 September 1889, the hundred was severed from Blyth council and annexed instead to the District Council of Snowtown as the Everard ward.

In 1912, at the instigation of resident landowners, a southern portion of the hundred south of Everard Road and including the Everard Central township, was severed from Snowtown council and added to the District Council of Balaklava as part of its Stow ward. From 1987, following the merging of Snowtown and Blyth councils, the larger north part of the hundred retained is ward status with 2 council representatives in the Blyth-Snowtown council. From 1997, following the Blyth-Snowtown amalgamation with the District Council of Wakefield Plains, the entire hundred became part of the much larger North ward of the Wakefield Regional Council.

Geology
Everard Central contains a series of ephemeral salt lake basins. The lunette formations at the basin edges contain deposits of gypsum. Gypsum for agricultural use is mined at the site, with 35,000 tonnes being obtained by G.J. Mills and McArdle in 2002.

See also
List of cities and towns in South Australia
Lands administrative divisions of South Australia

References

External links
Wakefield Regional Council

Towns in South Australia